Paralpenus flavicosta is a moth of the family Erebidae. It was described by George Hampson in 1909. It is found in Cameroon, Kenya, Sierra Leone, Zambia and Zimbabwe.

Subspecies
Paralpenus flavicosta flavicosta
Paralpenus flavicosta punctigera (Hering, 1928) (Cameroon)

References

Spilosomina
Moths described in 1909